Black Donald (Scottish Gaelic: Domhnall Dubh or Domnuill-dhu) is a Highland colloquialism for the Devil in Scottish mythology. The defining characteristic of Black Donald is his cloven feet, which betray whatever disguise he assumes.

In history 
 The first chief of historical record, and the eleventh chief, of Clan Cameron was Domnhuill Dubh, who fought as a vassal of the Lord of the Isles at Harlaw in 1411.

References 

Scottish mythology
Devils